Solomon Partners, previously known as PJ Solomon, is an independently operated American investment bank and financial services company headquartered in New York City. Solomon Partners advises on mergers, acquisitions, divestitures, restructurings, recapitalizations, SPACs and capital markets.

History
Solomon Partners was founded in 1989 by Peter J. Solomon and was one of the first private independent investment banking firms on Wall Street, created to mirror the ethos and culture of the originally privately held investment banks at a time when many of the large investment banks had gone public.

Solomon Partners is headquartered in New York City and has added offices in Chicago and Fort Lauderdale.

In June 2016, Solomon Partners entered into an alliance with Natixis, a French financial services firm owned by Groupe BPCE, to create an enhanced global M&A advisory and financing platform.

In September 2021, the company changed its name to Solomon Partners.

Transactions
Solomon Partners' practices cover multiple industry verticals, including business services, consumer retail, financial sponsors, fintech, grocery, pharmacy and restaurants, healthcare, infrastructure, power and renewables and technology, media and telecommunications. Select transactions include advising on the following areas.

Consumer retail

 Nutraceutical International Corporation on its $446 million sale to private equity firm HGGC LLC

Grocery, pharmacy and restaurants

 Save-A-Lot on its $1 billion recapitalization and conversion sales

Technology, media and telecommunications

 Banijay on its acquisition of Endemol Shine Group

References

External links
 Official website
 M&A activity has already blown past the $2 trillion mark in a record-breaking 2021. Fortune, June 2, 2021.
 Amazon and Walmart are investing capital to be both leading retailers and leading grocers: M&A Advisor. Yahoo! Finance, June 21, 2021.
 PJ SOLOMON Appoints Jon Hammack as New Global Head of Healthcare. GlobeNewswire, July 1, 2021.
 CVS and Walgreens Were Reeling. Now They're Riding a COVID-19 Wave. The Wall Street Journal, June 18, 2021.
 
 Kanter, Rosabeth Moss, Barry A. Stein, and Todd D. Jick (1992). . New York: Simon & Schuster. .

Investment banks in the United States
American companies established in 1989
Financial services companies established in 1989
Banks established in 1989